Francis Joseph Green (July 7, 1906 – May 11, 1995) was an American prelate of the Roman Catholic Church. He served as bishop of the Diocese of Tucson from 1960 to 1981.

Biography

Early life 
Francis Green was born on July 7, 1906, in Corning, New York.  The family moved to Prescott, Arizona, following his father's death in 1919. As a young man, Green  worked in the shops of the Santa Fe Railroad. In 1920,  he entered St. Joseph's College in Mountain View, California. Green completed his theological studies at St. Patrick's Seminary in Menlo Park, California.

Priesthood 
Green was ordained to the priesthood for the Diocese of Tucson on May 15, 1932. He then returned to Arizona, where he later became pastor of the SS. Peter and Paul Parish in Tucson in 1937. He was named both a domestic prelate and vicar general of the diocese in 1950.

Auxiliary Bishop, Coadjutor Bishop and Bishop of Tucson 
On May 29, 1953, Green was appointed as an auxiliary bishop of the Diocese of Tucson and titular bishop of Serra by Pope Pius XII. He received his episcopal consecration on September 7, 1953, from Bishop Daniel Gercke, with Bishops James Davis and Hugh Donohoe serving as co-consecrators. Green was named coadjutor bishop of Tucson by Pope John XXIII on May 11, 1960. 

Upon the resignation of Bishop Daniel James Gercke, Green automatically succeeded him as the fourth bishop of Tucson on September 28, 1960. He attended all four sessions of the Second Vatican Council in Rome between 1962 and 1965, calling it "one of the great experiences of [his] life." He began major restoration on St. Augustine's Cathedral in 1966, completing the effort in 1968. Green was instrumental in founding the Arizona Ecumenical Council, became an advocate of social justice, and provide ministries for African American, Native American, and Hispanic Catholics.

Retirement and legacy 
Pope Paul II accepted Green's resignation as bishop of the Diocese of Tucson on July 28, 1981. Francis Green died in Tucson, Arizona, on May 11, 1995, at age 88.

References

1906 births
1995 deaths
Saint Patrick's Seminary and University alumni
People from Corning, New York
Participants in the Second Vatican Council
20th-century Roman Catholic bishops in the United States
Catholics from New York (state)